Avraham "Avrum" Burg (born 19 January 1955) is an Israeli author, politician and businessman. He was a member of the Knesset, chairman of the Jewish Agency for Israel, Speaker of the Knesset, and Interim President of Israel. He was the first Speaker of the Knesset to have been born in Israel after its declaration of independence in 1948. A member of the Labor Party when he was a member of the Knesset, Burg announced in January 2015 that he had joined Hadash.

From the 2000s onwards he has expressed views described as post-Zionist, a label he self-identified with in 2011. He is in favor of Israel negotiating with Hamas, and has called to abandon Herzelian Zionism (calling it a scaffolding that should be removed) in favor of a form of Cultural Zionism, also citing the civic nationalism of France as an example to follow.

Early life
He was born and raised in Jerusalem's Rehavia neighborhood. His father was Dr. Yosef Burg, a German-born Israeli politician and longtime government minister for the National Religious Party. His mother was Rivka (née Slonim) who was born in Hebron and a survivor of the 1929 Hebron massacre.

In the Israel Defense Forces, Burg served as a platoon commander with the rank of lieutenant in the paratroopers brigade. He graduated from the Hebrew University of Jerusalem with a degree in the social sciences.

Burg married Yael, and they had six children. He lives in Nataf, a rural community, on the outskirts of Jerusalem.

Political career
Burg was an activist in left-wing organizations and the Peace Now movement. He was injured in the grenade attack on a Peace Now demonstration in Jerusalem in February 1983 which killed Emil Grunzweig. In 1985, he served as advisor on Diaspora affairs to Prime Minister Shimon Peres. In 1988, he was elected to the Knesset as a member of the Alignment.

In 1992, when the Alignment became the Labor Party, he was reelected to Knesset. He served as chairman of the Education Committee.

In 1995, he was appointed Chairman of the Jewish Agency and the World Zionist Organization, and resigned from the Knesset. As head of the Jewish Agency, he worked to recover Jewish property lost during The Holocaust and in the transfer of approximately half a million predominantly Jewish citizens from the Commonwealth of Independent States (the former Soviet Union) to Israel. After his term as chairman of the Jewish Agency, Burg continued to use a car and driver provided by the agency for 10 years. When it was cut he sued to continue to receive these benefits, but lost the court case, with the judge saying, "Burg didn't explain the fact that he also uses the car for his own personal business."

In 1999, Burg returned to domestic politics, and was elected to the Knesset on Ehud Barak's One Israel list (an alliance of Labor, Meimad and Gesher). Although Prime Minister Barak backed another candidate, Burg was elected Speaker of the Knesset, a position he held until early 2003. In his capacity as speaker of the Knesset he served as interim President of Israel for 20 days, from 12 July until 1 August 2000 when the presidency was vacant following Ezer Weizman's resignation.

Following Barak's defeat in the 2001 election for Prime Minister and his subsequent resignation, Burg ran for the Labor Party leadership, and won amid accusations of voter fraud. In a revote he lost to Binyamin Ben-Eliezer. Burg called for cancellation of this second vote, a move supported by Labor Party chairman Ra'anan Cohen. Nevertheless, Burg retained his seat in the Knesset in the 2003 elections.

Also in 2003, Burg published an article in Yedioth Ahronoth in which he declared, "Israel, having ceased to care about the children of the Palestinians, should not be surprised when they come washed in hatred and blow themselves up in the centers of Israeli escapism."

After retirement
In 2004, Burg resigned from the Knesset and public life. He became a businessman. In 2007, a Burg-led consortium won the rights to purchase Ashot Ashkelon Industries, but the sale was cancelled by the Israeli government. Burg's attorney said that if it was cancelled since the government wanted to sell it together with Israel Military Industries (IMI), "we may bid for IMI." There had also been a review by the State Comptroller and the Israeli Police "into suspicions that [Burg] was a straw-man for Ian Nigel Davis and Aviv Algor. (Davis and Algor have been indicted in a securities case, on charges of fraudulently obtaining the approval of Middle East Tube Ltd. shareholders for a 250,000-shekel monthly management fee.) The prosecutor closed the file against Burg for lack of evidence."

Burg has lectured at international events and served on the board of directors of Vita Pri Hagalil. Burg was embroiled in a controversy over an "alleged missing 270,000,000 New Israel Shekels," money lent to Vita Pri Hagalil. Burg referred to the banks involved as being "hypocritical" since according to Burg, the banks had received substantial interest payments on the loan. However, a senior banker questioned this, saying "had the owners demonstrated serious intent to use the capital injection to rescue the company, there's no question that we'd contribute to the rescue effort. The owners' abandonment of responsibility is what forced us to ask for the appointment of a receiver. We had no choice."

In 2007, Burg published a book called Defeating Hitler in which he claimed that Israeli society is fascist and violent by the continuing trauma over the Holocaust.

In an interview in Haaretz in June 2007, Burg suggested abolishing the Law of Return and stated that "to define the State of Israel as a Jewish state is the key to its end. A Jewish state is explosive. It's dynamite." He also called on all Israelis to obtain foreign citizenship if possible. Burg himself had acquired French citizenship in 2004, as part of his campaign in Israel calling "on everyone who can to obtain a foreign passport." In response to public criticism of the interview, however, he published a retraction, recommending that Israel be defined not as a "Jewish State" but as a "State of the Jews." In 2021 he stated that he was preparing to appeal to the Supreme Court to have the Interior Ministry erase from its records that his nationality is Jewish.

In April 2008, Burg signed a letter of support for the recently created J Street American left-wing lobby group. On 14 November 2008, he joined a new left-wing movement intending to support the Meretz-Yachad party in the 2009 national elections.

In 2011, Burg wrote an op-ed in Haaretz claiming that there was a reasonable chance of a one-state solution coming to pass. On the possibility of one state, he wrote, "It is likely to be a country with nationalist, racist and religious discrimination and one that is patently not democratic, like the one that exists today. But it could be something entirely different. An entity with a common basis for at least three players: an ideological right that is prepared to examine its feasibility; a left, part of which is starting to free itself of the illusions of "Jewish and democratic"; and a not inconsiderable part of the Palestinian intelligentsia. The conceptual framework will be agreed upon - a democratic state that belongs to all of its citizens. The practicable substance could be fertile ground for arguments and creativity. This is an opportunity worth taking, despite our grand experience of missing every opportunity and accusing everyone else except ourselves."

In 2012, Burg endorsed a boycott of Israeli settlement products and said that he personally boycotts all products produced in the settlements and does not cross the Green Line. He also called Israel "the last colonial occupier in the Western world."

In 2012, Burg became a senior fellow of Molad – The Center for Renewal of Democracy, a "new think tank committed to leftist renewal." According to an article in Haaretz, "the center is funded by left-liberal foundations and groups from the U.S. associated with the Democratic party."

In early December 2013, he confirmed the existence of Israel's nuclear weapons during a speech at a conference aimed at denuclearising the Middle East. He stated that national policy of neither confirming or denying the existence of such weapons as "outdated and childish."

Burg joined the leftist Jewish-Arab Hadash Party in January 2015. In a subsequent interview, he criticized Israel for continuing to follow Zionism as a national ideology and calling for the Law of Return to be reduced to a minimum. He also stated that Israel's future was a choice between becoming a fundamentalist Jewish state or as a binational Jewish-Arab confederation with open borders and part of a regional union.

Burg has been a devoted athlete, running marathons and participating in a few ironmen competitions.

He is vegan.

In April 2015, after Jewish immigration to Israel from European countries had significantly increased after several incidents involving Jews in Europe, Burg published an op-ed in Haaretz dissuading anti-Semitism allegations and calling on Jews to remain in Europe.

Published works
 Brit Am: A Covenant of the People, Proposed Policy Guidelines for the National Institutions of the Jewish People, (1995), Jewish Agency for Israel - 
God is Back (2006) (Hebrew) - 
Defeating Hitler (2007) Yedioth Ahronoth (Hebrew) - 
The Holocaust Is Over: We Must Rise From its Ashes (2008) MacMillan.com,  - 
Weekly Torah Portion for Human Beings (2009) (Hebrew) - 
Avishag (2011) (Hebrew) - 
Here Come the Days (2015) (Autobiography) (Hebrew) -

References

External links 

'Leaving the Zionist ghetto' by Ari Shavit Haaretz interview, 24 June 2007
Interview with Donald Macintyre Independent Newspaper. London 1 November 2008
Video (and audio) of Burg discussing the Holocaust (among other things) with Gershom Gorenberg on Bloggingheads.tv
12 February 2008 Video (or audio) of Interview with Burg discussing his new book "The Holocaust Is Over: We Must Rise From Its Ashes" with Amy Goodman and Juan Gonzalez on Democracy Now
Avraham Burg: "The Holocaust Is Over" – Caught in a National Trauma, Ulrich von Schwerin, Qantara.de 2009. Translated from the German by Aingeal Flanagan
Avraham Burg on Molad – the Center for the Renewal of Israeli Democracy's website.

1955 births
Jewish Agency for Israel
Living people
Israeli feminists
Israeli Jews
Israeli people of German-Jewish descent
Hebrew University of Jerusalem Faculty of Social Sciences alumni
Heads of the Jewish Agency for Israel
Male feminists
Israeli Labor Party politicians
One Israel politicians
Hadash politicians
People from Jerusalem
Members of the 12th Knesset (1988–1992)
Members of the 13th Knesset (1992–1996)
Members of the 15th Knesset (1999–2003)
Members of the 16th Knesset (2003–2006)
Speakers of the Knesset
Israeli non-fiction writers
Orthodox Jewish feminists
Orthodox Jewish socialists
Post-Zionists